Mielno is a Baltic coastal resort in West Pomeranian Voivodeship, Poland.

Mielno may also refer to:

Mielno, Inowrocław County in Kuyavian-Pomeranian Voivodeship (north-central Poland)
Mielno, Włocławek County in Kuyavian-Pomeranian Voivodeship (north-central Poland)
Mielno, Mogilno County in Kuyavian-Pomeranian Voivodeship (north-central Poland)
Mielno, Gniezno County in Greater Poland Voivodeship (west-central Poland)
Mielno, Konin County in Greater Poland Voivodeship (west-central Poland)
Mielno, Poznań County in Greater Poland Voivodeship (west-central Poland)
Mielno, Szamotuły County in Greater Poland Voivodeship (west-central Poland)
Mielno, Bytów County in Pomeranian Voivodeship (north Poland)
Mielno, Krosno Odrzańskie County in Lubusz Voivodeship (west Poland)
Mielno, Zielona Góra County in Lubusz Voivodeship (west Poland)
Mielno, Żary County in Lubusz Voivodeship (west Poland)
Mielno, Słupsk County in Pomeranian Voivodeship (north Poland)
Mielno, Warmian-Masurian Voivodeship (north Poland)
Mielno, Łobez County in West Pomeranian Voivodeship (north-west Poland)